Ilgiz Nuriyev (born 21 January 1984 in Surgut) is a Russian professional ice hockey player who currently plays for Arystan Temirtau in the Kazakhstan Hockey Championship league.

References

External links

Russian ice hockey forwards
Arystan Temirtau players
1984 births
Living people
Asian Games gold medalists for Kazakhstan
Medalists at the 2017 Asian Winter Games
Asian Games medalists in ice hockey
Ice hockey players at the 2017 Asian Winter Games
Sportspeople from Surgut